The 1925 Boston Braves season was the 55th season of the franchise.

Offseason 
 February 4, 1925: Cotton Tierney was traded by the Braves to the Brooklyn Robins for Bernie Neis.

Regular season

Season standings

Record vs. opponents

Notable transactions 
 June 18, 1925: Shanty Hogan was signed by the Braves as an amateur free agent.
 October 6, 1925: Gus Felix, Jesse Barnes and Mickey O'Neil were traded by the Braves to the Brooklyn Robins for Zack Taylor, Jimmy Johnston, and Eddie Brown.

Roster

Player stats

Batting

Starters by position 
Note: Pos = Position; G = Games played; AB = At bats; H = Hits; Avg. = Batting average; HR = Home runs; RBI = Runs batted in

Other batters 
Note: G = Games played; AB = At bats; H = Hits; Avg. = Batting average; HR = Home runs; RBI = Runs batted in

Pitching

Starting pitchers 
Note: G = Games pitched; IP = Innings pitched; W = Wins; L = Losses; ERA = Earned run average; SO = Strikeouts

Other pitchers 
Note: G = Games pitched; IP = Innings pitched; W = Wins; L = Losses; ERA = Earned run average; SO = Strikeouts

Relief pitchers 
Note: G = Games pitched; W = Wins; L = Losses; SV = Saves; ERA = Earned run average; SO = Strikeouts

References

External links
1925 Boston Braves season at Baseball Reference

Boston Braves seasons
Boston Braves
Boston Braves
1920s in Boston